General Sir John Coape Sherbrooke,  (29 April 1764 – 14 February 1830) was a British soldier and colonial administrator. After serving in the British army in Nova Scotia, the Netherlands, India, the Mediterranean (including Sicily), and Spain, he was appointed Lieutenant-Governor of Nova Scotia in 1811. During the War of 1812, his policies and victory in the conquest of present-day Maine, renaming it the colony of New Ireland, led to significant prosperity in Nova Scotia.

Early life
John Coape Sherbrooke was born in Oxton, Nottinghamshire, on 29 April 1764, the third son of the wealthy country squire William Coape  and his wife Sarah Sherbrooke. The surname comes from Shirebrook, Derbyshire.  Upon his marriage Sherbrooke's father had taken his wife's surname as his own.

Army career

Early career
Sherbrooke joined the British Army as an ensign in the 4th Regiment of Foot on 7 December 1780. He was promoted to lieutenant on 22 December 1781 and then transferred to the 85th Regiment of Foot when he became a captain on 6 March 1783. The end of the American Revolutionary War brought a number of reductions to the army and this included the disbanding of the 85th, and so on 23 June 1785 Sherbrooke transferred to the 33rd Regiment of Foot which was at the time serving in Halifax, Nova Scotia. He returned to England in 1786. When the French Revolutionary War began in 1793 Sherbrooke was still a captain but was quickly promoted twice so that by the end of May 1794 he was a lieutenant colonel in the 33rd and second in command to Colonel Arthur Wellesley. Under Wellesley he fought in the Flanders Campaign between March 1793 and April 1795, as a part of which he fought at the Battle of Boxtel on 13 September 1794 before participating in the retreat towards north-west Germany at the end of the year.

After an attempt to join the West Indies Campaign in October 1795 was aborted due to large storms in the English Channel Sherbrooke and the 33rd were instead sent to serve in India, arriving at Calcutta in February 1797. Sherbrooke was promoted to colonel on 1 January 1798 and as such fought in the Fourth Anglo-Mysore War, participating in the final defeat of Tipu Sultan at the Siege of Seringapatam on 4 May 1799. His service in India was cut short when he fell ill with malaria which forced him to return to England, doing so in 1800. Sherbrooke's break in service was exacerbated by the Peace of Amiens in 1802, at which point he went on half pay.

The Peace ended in May 1803 with the start of the Napoleonic Wars and Sherbrooke accordingly resumed active service, being given command of the 4th Battalion of the Army of Reserve, a home defence force created to prepare for a French invasion, based at Norman Cross. He was promoted to major general on 1 January 1805 and served under Wellesley in the Hanover Expedition between 8 November and 15 February. In June he was transferred to Sicily where he served as a subordinate to Lieutenant-General Sir John Moore and commanded at Messina; most of the troops (and Moore) were withdrawn from Sicily in October 1807, leaving Sherbrooke in command of British interests on the island. In February he had also became colonel of the Royal Sicilian Regiment. While the court of King Ferdinand urged Sherbrooke to make offensive manoeuvres towards mainland Italy with his troops, he instead began to improve Sicily's defences and prepare for a possible French invasion. He left the island in June 1808, having been superseded by Lieutenant-General Sir John Stuart.

Peninsular War

Sherbrooke was next given command of 4,000 men to assist Spanish patriots in Cadiz as part of the Peninsular War, in February 1809. The patriots did not want the British to interfere and so his force was redirected to Lisbon where he joined the main British army commanded by Wellesley, soon to become Lord Wellington. He was promoted to lieutenant general on 12 April and was the second-most senior general in the army behind Wellington. He fought at the Second Battle of Porto on 12 May with a formation of men that on 18 June was designated the 1st Division. The same month as the Second Battle of Porto, Sherbrooke became colonel of the 68th Regiment of Foot. With his division Sherbrooke fought at the Battle of Talavera in July where he successfully fought off the attacks of the French infantry but then lost control of three of his brigades in the subsequent charge, leaving a dangerous gap in the British line.

At Talavera, Sherbrooke's 1st Division included four brigades: Henry Frederick Campbell's British Guards - 2,045 men, Alan Cameron of Erracht's British regulars - 1,364, Ernst Langwerth's King's German Legion (KGL) - 1,388, and Sigismund von Löw's KGL - 1,167. Early on 28 July 1809, the numerically superior French artillery took the British positions under fire. While in one sector, British units were withdrawn out of sight from the French guns, Sherbrooke's division occupied an exposed position and suffered casualties before gunsmoke hid its position. The main French attack occurred at 3:00 pm when the French divisions of Pierre Belon Lapisse and Horace Sebastiani advanced against the 1st Division. Sherbrooke ordered his infantry not to fire until the French came within  and then to charge. These orders were carried out to the letter, causing tremendous casualties and compelling the French to hastily retreat. Apparently, Sherbrooke forgot to warn his officers not to advance too far and all the brigades except Cameron's recklessly rushed after their fleeing enemies. When the disordered Guards and the KGL came up against the intact French second line, it was their turn to take to their heels as the fresh French foot soldiers counterattacked. The day was saved by the appearance of John Randoll Mackenzie's reserve brigade and the 1st Battalion of the 48th Foot. Sherbrooke's routed troops quickly rallied behind the reinforcements and, after an extended exchange of musketry, the French counterattack was defeated. Losses were ghastly on both sides. Sebastiani's division suffered 2,100 casualties out of 8,000 while Lapisse's division lost 1,700 men out of 6,800, including Lapisse killed. In Sherbrooke's division, Langwerth was killed and his brigade reduced to 650 men, Löw's brigade lost 350 men, Cameron's brigade lost 500 men, and the Guards sustained 611 casualties. Mackenzie was killed and his brigade lost 632 men.

Sherbrooke commanded the 1st Division through the retreat to Portugal, where he threatened to hang his commissary officer if he did not provide the required food for his division, and for his service at Porto and Talavera was appointed a Knight Commander of the Order of the Bath in September. A recurrence of Sherbrooke's malaria forced him to resign his command on 26 April 1810 and he was appointed Lieutenant Governor of Nova Scotia on 19 August 1811.

War of 1812
Sherbrooke arrived at Halifax on 16 October 1811, as military commander of the Provinces of Nova-Scotia, New-Brunswick, and their Dependencies, including the Islands of Newfoundland, Cape Breton, Prince Edward and Bermuda. The area of command was referred to as the Halifax Command or Nova Scotia Command.

When the War of 1812 began Sherbrooke initially fought a phoney war, allowing trade to continue with Maine to the benefit of British merchants. Having complained at the lack of defences available to protect the colony and that the extant fortifications were dilapidated, he mounted guns at harbour entrances across the colony and placed the militias in a state of readiness to repel attacks. Sherbrooke's tactic of informally continuing trade with the neighbouring American states while still making sure that his own territory was amply protected provided an opportunity for the Atlantic-facing provinces of Canada to enhance their place in international trade; they were able to flourish at a time when other areas were stifled by war.

When the Napoleonic Wars ended in April 1814 more troops were made available for North America; Sherbrooke used this opportunity to attack the disputed area of Maine between Passamaquoddy Bay and the Penobscot River, landing an expeditionary force of 2,000 men  at Castine that August and proceeding to subdue the area between the Penobscot and St Croix rivers. He renamed the region the royal colony of New Ireland. Sherbrooke was able to collect customs dues while he occupied Castine, and these funds were in later years used to finance the Cambridge Military Library in Halifax and to create Dalhousie College. New Ireland remained under the control of Britain until April 1815, although Sherbrooke himself only stayed there for four weeks, when the Treaty of Ghent restored it to the United States. For his service during the war he was elevated to Knight Grand Cross of the Order of the Bath.

While the majority of Sherbrooke's tenure as Lieutenant Governor of Nova Scotia was spent concentrating on the war, he also made a significant effort to increase support for the Church of England, as most of the population were dissenters. While largescale changes were voted down by the Nova Scotia House of Assembly, he provided small sums of money for the Church via taxation and allotted undeveloped land to it for the construction of religious buildings. At the same time Sherbrooke was aware that his support of the Church was not popular and so he held a careful balance between the two religious factions, ensuring for example that religious appointments were taken up by moderates and not zealots.

British North America
His active defence of the colony during the War of 1812 combined with his proven ability to work competently with the civilian population led to his appointment as Governor General of British North America (fully Captain General and Governor in Chief in and over the Provinces of Lower-Canada, Upper-Canada, Nova Scotia, New-Brunswick, and their several dependencies, Vice-Admiral of the same, Lieutenant-General and Commander of all His Majesty’s Forces in the said Provinces of Lower-Canada & Upper-Canada, Nova-Scotia and New-Brunswick, and their several dependencies, and in the Islands of Newfoundland, Prince Edward, Cape Breton, and Bermuda, &c. &c. &c)  in 1816. His talent as a mediator helped settle disputes between the Francophone and English political factions; he formed a good relationship with the leader of the Francophone faction, Bishop Joseph-Octave Plessis, while at the same time cementing the position of the Chief Justice of Lower Canada Jonathan Sewell despite Plessis' faction having previously impeached him. Similarly, he won the confidence of Louis-Joseph Papineau by providing him with a permanent salary but made sure to not show favour by doing the same for Sewell.

Retirement and death
Sherbrooke continued to work actively into 1817, concentrating on reforming the colony's public finances, but once again was set back by his failing health. He found that the cold Canadian winters helped bring on recurrences of his malaria, and also suffered a paralytic stroke on 6 February 1818. He handed over his duties to Charles Lennox, 4th Duke of Richmond on 30 July and sailed for home. He reached England in September and spent much time recuperating at the spas of Bath and Cheltenham while living at Calverton in Nottinghamshire. He was promoted to general on 27 May 1825 and died at Calverton on 14 February 1830.

Family
Sherbrooke married Katherina (died 15 May 1856), the daughter of Reginald Pyndar, rector of Madresfield, on 24 August 1811 at Areley Kings. They had no children.

Personality and legacy
Sherbrooke was well-known for his short temper and abrasive language, with Wellington noting that he was the most passionate man he had ever met. Henry Edward Bunbury said of him that:

While he resided in Nova Scotia, his home was at Birch Cove on Bedford Basin, near Halifax. Named Sherwood, it eventually lent its name to the neighbourhoods of Sherwood Park and Sherwood Heights. The community of Sherbrooke, Nova Scotia also bears his name. Other honorific eponyms are listed below:

Geographic locations
  Nova Scotia: Sherbrooke
  Nova Scotia: New Ross, formerly known as Sherbrooke
  Quebec: Sherbrooke
  Quebec: Rue Sherbrooke, Montreal

Buildings
  Quebec: Sherbrooke Station, Montreal
 Sherbrooke Martello Tower (1814–1828; four guns), at McNabs Cove, opposite York Redoubt at Halifax harbour.
 Fort Sherbrooke (Maine)

Vessels
 Sir John Sherbrooke
 Sir John Sherbrooke
 Barbados

See also 
Military history of Nova Scotia
The Sherbrooke Hussars

Citations

References

 
 Dawson, Joan (2007). The Mapmaker's Legacy: Nineteenth-century Nova Scotia Through Maps. Halifax: Nimbus. 
 Heathcote, T.A. (2010). Wellington's Peninsular War Generals & Their Battles: A Biographical and Historical Dictionary. Barnsley, South Yorkshire: Pen & Sword.

External links
 National Assembly biography (in French)
 Archives of Sir John Coape Sherbrooke (Sir John Coape Sherbrooke fonds, R2513) are held at Library and Archives Canada

1764 births
1830 deaths
British Army generals
British Army personnel of the French Revolutionary Wars
British Army personnel of the Napoleonic Wars
British people of the War of 1812
Governors of British North America
Governors of the Colony of Nova Scotia
People from Newark and Sherwood (district)
33rd Regiment of Foot officers
68th Regiment of Foot officers
British military personnel of the Fourth Anglo-Mysore War
Military history of Nova Scotia
British Army personnel of the American Revolutionary War